Lathrop/Manteca station is a train station in southern Lathrop, California, served by Altamont Corridor Express (ACE) service. The station is located on rail tracks and a rail yard that is on land that was once a turkey farm.

The station was studied to be relocated further south as part of the ACEforward project, but this concept was eliminated from consideration.

References

External links 

 ACE Lathrop/Manteca Station

Altamont Corridor Express stations in San Joaquin County, California
Lathrop, California
Railway stations in the United States opened in 1998
Amtrak Thruway Motorcoach stations in California